Lisha Kill flows through Lisha Kill, New York before emptying into the Mohawk River in Niskayuna, New York. The stream is also referred to as Lisha's Kill and received its name from a local legend about a Native American woman who is buried along its banks.

References 

Rivers of New York (state)
Rivers of Schenectady County, New York
Mohawk River